is a private women's university in Nagasaki, Japan. It enrolls approximately 1,300 students and has exchange agreements with 28 universities in 8 countries.

Schools and faculties

As of 2021, the university had a Graduate School (for English Literature and Language); a Faculty of International Cultural Studies (Departments of English  and Japanese Culture); a Faculty of Music (Department of Music); a Faculty of Wellness Studies (Departments of Nutritional Health, Design and Science for Human Life, and Child Development and Education); and a Faculty of Nursing (Department of Nursing).

Administration
Kwassui Women's University is operated by an education foundation, Kwassui Gakuin, which also runs Kwassui Junior High School and Kwassui High School.

History
The university's predecessor, Kwassui Girls' School, was founded by an American Methodist missionary, Elizabeth Russell, in 1879. It was recognized as Kwassui Women's College in 1919.

In 1950, under the new education system, it became Kwassui Women's Junior College. The university was established in 1981 and the graduate school in 1991. The name Kwassui Women's College remained in use until September 2010.

References

External links
Kwassui Women's University

Private universities and colleges in Japan
Educational institutions established in 1879
Women's universities and colleges in Japan
Buildings and structures in Nagasaki
Universities and colleges in Nagasaki Prefecture
1879 establishments in Japan
Christian universities and colleges in Japan